Ash Merlyn International School is located in Elelenwo, Port Harcourt, Rivers State. It is a private mixed school serving pupils aged 3 to 11. The school website: www.ashmerlynintsch.com. The school was founded in September 2011 and is focused on "Building global champions".

References

Schools in Port Harcourt
Educational institutions established in 2011
Primary schools in Rivers State
2011 establishments in Nigeria
2010s establishments in Rivers State
Elelenwo, Port Harcourt